The Peru national football team kit is the official sportswear used by the association football team organised by the Peruvian Football Federation (FPF) to represent Peru in international football friendlies and competitions.

Due to its long history and wide popular appeal, Peru's football kit has become an unofficial national symbol.
The Peru national football team plays in red and white, the country's national colours.

Since 1936, Peru's first-choice kit has been white shirts, white shorts and white socks with a distinctive red "sash" crossing the shirt diagonally from the proper left shoulder to the right hip. This basic scheme has been only slightly altered over the years.

History 
Historical records from the Peruvian Football Federation (FPF) indicate that, in the early 20th century, when Peruvians and Englishmen played football matches in Callao (Peru's chief seaport), the locals wore red shirts to distinguish themselves from the foreigners. During leisure, British civilian workers and sailors played the sport among themselves and with locals in Callao and other commercial zones throughout South America. In 1924, the FPF also equipped with red sweaters and white shorts the team representing it in a match against the team representing the Uruguayan Football Association—although neither side claimed the teams as their official national squads, sports historian Jaime Pulgar-Vidal Otálora argues that the local spectators understood the Peruvian side, composed of players from Callao and Lima (Peru's capital), to represent their national football team. The FPF intended to present this squad as Peru's official national team at the 1924 South American Championship, which was held in Montevideo to celebrate the Uruguayan national football team's victory at the 1924 Summer Olympics, but internal disputes and economic troubles impeded the Peruvians from traveling to Uruguay for the tournament.

The Peru national football team wore its first official kit at its formal debut in the 1927 South American Championship held in Lima. Peru's kit comprised a white-and-red striped jersey (a thick vertical stripe running down the middle front and back, with two equally-thick vertical stripe on the sides), white shorts, and black socks. Financial difficulties almost impeded Peru from organizing the tournament, but the Peruvian government of Augusto B. Leguía intervened to guarantee the tournament's financial sustainability. Leguía's government promoted the development of football as the country's national pastime, and Peruvian society at the time considered that the president sponsored the local football club Alianza Lima. Peruvian sports historians debate Leguía's personal involvement with football, and with Alianza Lima in particular, but Pulgar-Vidal Otálora points out that it might not be mere coincidence that Peru's first official national football kit nearly identically resembled that of Alianza—its blue-colored stripes and shorts marked the only difference with the national kit. Peru used this kit for six official matches, three at Lima's tournament and three at the 1929 South American Championship held in Buenos Aires.

Peru were compelled to use an alternative design in the 1930 World Cup because Paraguay had already registered a kit with white-and-red striped shirts. The Peruvians instead wore white shirts with a red collar, white shorts and black socks.

For the 1935 South American Championship, a horizontal red stripe was added to the shirt.

The following year, at the Berlin Olympics, the team adopted the red sash design it has retained ever since. According to Pulgar-Vidal Otálora, the idea for the diagonal red stripe came from school matches. More specific alterations

Sponsorship 

The Peru national football team has had eight official kit suppliers The first of these, Adidas, began supplying the team's kit in 1978. Peru have since had contracts with Penalty (1981–82), Adidas (1983–85), Calvo Sportwear (1987), Power (1989–91), Diadora (1991–92), local manufacturer Polmer (1993–95), Umbro (1996–97), and Peruvian company Walon Sport (1998–2010). Umbro have produced the team's kit since 2010. Marathon supplied kits since 1 August 2018.

Suppliers

Design 

Peru wears as its badge the emblem of the Peruvian Football Federation. The first badge, presented in 1927, had a heater shield design with the country's name and the federation's acronym (FPF). Eight different emblems followed, with the longest-lasting design being the modern French escutcheon form emblazoned in the team's jersey from 1953 until 2014. This design had the Peruvian flag at its base, and either the country's name or the federation's acronym at its top. Since 2014, the badge has a retro-inspired heater shield design, with the entire field comprised by Peru's flag and the federation's acronym, surrounded by a gold-colored frame.

First kits

Second kits

Popularity 

Peru's kit has won praise as one of world football's most attractive designs. Christopher Turpin, the executive producer of NPR's All Things Considered news show, lauded the 1970 iteration as "the beautiful game's most beautiful shirt", also describing it as "retro even in 1970". Miles Kohrman, football reporter for The New Republic, commended Peru's kit as "one of soccer's best-kept secrets". Rory Smith, Chief Soccer Correspondent for The New York Times, referred to Peru's 2018 version of the jersey as "a classic" with a nostalgic, fan-pleasing "blood-red sash". The version worn in 1978 came first in a 2010 ESPN list of the "Best World Cup jerseys of all time", described therein as "simple yet strikingly effective".

The Peruvian kit allegedly impressed Malcolm Allison so much that he later introduced kits sporting sashes at Manchester City and Crystal Palace.

During the 2021 Peruvian presidential election, the Popular Force political party candidate Keiko Fujimori wore Peru's national football team jersey during rallies and debates. Some Peru national football team players also took to Twitter to promote the anti-communist message "Wear the Jersey Peru" (Spanish: "Ponte la camiseta Perú"), which implied support for Fujimori. Political analysts consider that the strategic use of the national team's jersey reduced the lead held by Pedro Castillo, the Free Peru political candidate. Castillo condemned what he called the "tarnishing" of the national team's jersey. Sociologist Sandro Venturo also expressed concern at the politicization of the national team's jersey, which he argues "in principle represents all Peruvians" regardless of their political leaning.

See also 

Chile and Peru football rivalry
Estadio Nacional (Lima)
Football in Peru
History of the Peru national football team
Peru national football team indiscipline scandals
Peru national football team records
Peru national football team results
Peruvian Primera División
Sport in Peru

Notes

References

Bibliography

External links 

Peru FA
FIFA team profile
ELO team records

Peru national football team
Association football kits